The Dore is a 140 km long river in central France in the department of Puy-de-Dôme. It is a right tributary of the Allier. Its source is near the town of Saint-Germain-l'Herm in the Massif Central. The Dore flows generally north, through the following towns: Arlanc, Ambert, Courpière, and Puy-Guillaume. The Dore flows into the Allier 6 km north of Puy-Guillaume.

Affluents
Dolore, Miodet (left bank), Vauziron

References

Rivers of France
Rivers of Auvergne-Rhône-Alpes
Rivers of Puy-de-Dôme